Asthelys is a genus of sea snails, marine gastropod mollusks in the family Seguenziidae.

Description
The conical shell lacks axial riblets and a peripheral carina but has a punctate microsculpture. The midwhorl angulation is initially absent, but present on later whorls. The shell contains no spiral lirae. The U-shaped posterior sinus is shallow. The basal sinus is present, but there is no anterolateral sinus. The columella has no sinus or tooth. Tha aperture has a rhomboidal shape. There is no umbilical septum.

Radula: the rachidian tooth is broader than high and has lateral wings prominent. The lateral tooth cusp is broad. There are less than 10 marginal tooth pairs.

Species
Species within the genus Asthelys include:
 Asthelys antarctica Marshall, 1988
 Asthelys careyi Geiger, 2017
 Asthelys depressa Marshall, 1991
 Asthelys hyeresensis Hoffman, Gofas & Freiwald, 2020
 Asthelys munda (Watson, 1879)
 Asthelys nitidula Marshall, 1991
 Asthelys semiplicata Marshall, 1991
 Asthelys simplex (Watson, 1879)

References

 Marshall, B. A. (1988). New Seguenziidae (Mollusca: Gastropoda) from the Tasman, South Pacific, and Southern Antilles Basins. New Zealand Journal of Zoology 15: 235-247
 Marshall B.A. (1991). Mollusca Gastropoda : Seguenziidae from New Caledonia and the Loyalty Islands. In A. Crosnier & P. Bouchet (Eds) Résultats des campagnes Musorstom, vol. 7. Mémoires du Muséum National d'Histoire Naturelle, A, 150:41-109.

External links
 Quinn J. (1987). A revision of the Seguenziacea Verrill, 1884. II. The new genera Hadroconus, Rotellenzia, and Asthelys. Nautilus 101(2): 59-68

 
Seguenziidae
Gastropod genera